Arbanaška Mountain is a mountain in southern Serbia, near the town of Bojnik. The mountain is located in the municipality of Prokuplje. Its highest peak Vijogor has an elevation of 1128 meters above sea level.

See also
Arbanaško Hill (Serbian: Arbanaško brdo, "Arbanaška Hill"), a hill in Serbia
Arbanaška River, a river in Serbia
Arbanaška (Prokuplje), a village in Serbia

References

Mountains of Serbia